Lu Guimeng (died 881), courtesy name Luwang, was a recluse Chinese poet of the Tang dynasty. He lived in seclusion at Puli near Suzhou. His pseudonyms included Mr. Puli, Tiansuizhi, and Jianghu Sanren.

He and his friend, the fellow poet Pi Rixiu, created a new style of matching rhyme poetry. One of them would compose a poem, and the other would then reply with a new poem using the same rhyme. His works included:  
 Songlin Ji, a collection of matching rhyme poems by Lu and Pi Rixiu
 Puli Ji, Collection of Puli
 The Classic of the Plough, a book that described in detail the curved iron plough

Tomb 
Lu Guimeng's tomb is near the Baoshen temple in Luzhi, Suzhou.  Two tall ginkgo trees nearby were hand-planted by him and still stand today. The Fair Breeze Pavilion was reputed to be his favourite place for study and  meeting friends.

References
 Qian, Zhonglian, "Lu Guimeng". Encyclopedia of China (Chinese Literature Edition), 1st ed.

External links 
Books of the Quan Tangshi that include collected poems of Lu Guimeng at the Chinese Text Project:
Book 617, Book 618, Book 619, Book 620, Book 621, Book 622, Book 623,
Book 624, Book 625, Book 626, Book 627, Book 628, Book 629, Book 630

881 deaths
Tang dynasty poets
Year of birth unknown
Writers from Suzhou
9th-century Chinese poets
Poets from Jiangsu